The Lushai (Pron: ˌlʊˈʃaɪ) Hills (or Mizo Hills) are a mountain range in Mizoram and Manipur, India. The range is part of the Patkai range system and its highest point is 2,157 m high Phawngpui, also known as 'Blue Mountain'.

Flora and fauna
The hills are for the most part covered with dense bamboo jungle and rank undergrowth; but in the eastern portion, owing probably to a smaller rainfall, open grass-covered slopes are found, with groves of oak and pine interspersed with rhododendrons.  The Blue Mountain is the highest peak in Lushai hills.

Inhabitants
These hills are inhabited by the Lushais and other Mizo tribes, but the population is extremely scanty. When they invaded the district from the north. Their first attack upon British territory took place in November 1849, and after that date they proved one of the most troublesome tribes on the north-east frontier of India; but operations in 1890 resulted in the complete pacification of the northern Lushai villages, and in 1892 the eastern Lushais were reduced to order.

The management of the South Lushai hill country was transferred from Bengal to Assam in 1898. To obtain more efficient control over the country the district has been divided into eighteen circles, each in charge of an interpreter, through whom all orders are transmitted to the chiefs.

Bibliography
 T. H. Lewin, Wild Races of N.E. India (1870)
 Lushai Hills Gazetteer (Calcutta, 1906)

References

External links

 Mara district
 Famous mountains and hills of Northeast India